Béla Mezőssy (13 November 1870 – 19 January 1939) was a Hungarian politician, who served as Secretary of Agriculture from 1906 to 1910 and Minister of Agriculture between 1917 and his retirement in 1918.

References
 Magyar Életrajzi Lexikon	

1870 births
1939 deaths
People from Borsod-Abaúj-Zemplén County
People from the Kingdom of Hungary
Agriculture ministers of Hungary